Enixotrophon multigradus is a species of sea snail, a marine gastropod mollusk in the family Muricidae, the murex snails or rock snails.

Description

Distribution
This marine species occurs off New Caledonia.

References

 Houart, R., 1990. Four new species of Muricidae from New Caledonia. Venus 49(3): 205-214
 Marshall B.A. & Houart R. (2011) The genus Pagodula (Mollusca: Gastropoda: Muricidae) in Australia, the New Zealand region and the Tasman Sea. New Zealand Journal of Geology and Geophysics 54(1): 89–114.

External links
 Barco, A.; Marshall, B.; A. Houart, R.; Oliverio, M. (2015). Molecular phylogenetics of Haustrinae and Pagodulinae (Neogastropoda: Muricidae) with a focus on New Zealand species. Journal of Molluscan Studies. 81(4): 476-488

Gastropods described in 1990
Enixotrophon